Qeshlaq-e Hajjiabad (also Romanized as Qeshlāq-e Ḩājjīābād) is a village in Ferunabad Rural District, in the Central District of Pakdasht County, Tehran Province, Iran. At the 2006 census, its population was 906, in 203 families.

References 

Populated places in Pakdasht County